Coleophora meyi is a moth of the family Coleophoridae first described by Giorgio Baldizzone and Hugo van der Wolf in 2004 that is endemic to Namibia.

References

External links

meyi
Moths described in 2004
Endemic fauna of Namibia
Moths of Africa